Fountains and ponds of Stockholm are a common feature of parks and squares in Stockholm, Sweden. Erection of fountains and ponds
began in a larger scale  when many parks and public gardens were built around the turn of the century in the early 1900s.

History
The city's oldest functioning fountain is  Molins fontän erected  in Kungsträdgården  during 1873. 
The bronze fountain sculpture  was designed by Johan Peter Molin (1814-1873). Molin received the order on the fountain in the spring of 1866. It was unveiled on September 25, 1873 shortly after Molin's death.

An early fountain sculpture is Tors fiske built in 1903  at the current Mariatorget. 
The sculpture group and fountain in bronze was designed by Anders Henrik Wissler (1869-1941). The sculpture shows the moment when the Norse god Tor has captured the Midgard worm and  raises his hammer Mjölner to destroy the snake. The central figure is flanked by two water-spraying lizards.

Other early fountain sculptures include  Fontändamm  at  Aspudden  (1912)  by Albin Brag  (1878-1937),    Vesslan at   Kungsholmstorg  (1912) by Otto Strandman (1871-1960) and  Triton på delfin at  Centralbadsparken  (1923)  by Greta Klemming (1893-1961).

Gallery

See also
Architecture in Stockholm

References

Other sources
Andersson, Thorbjörn (2000)  Utanför staden: Parker i Stockholms förorter (Stockholm: Stockholmia Förlag) 
Asker, Bertil (1986)  Stockholms parker : innerstaden. Monografier utgivna av Stockholms stad (Stockholm: Liber Förlag)

External links
 Fountains and ponds of Stockholm  st stockholmskallan.se 
Buildings and structures in Stockholm
Tourist attractions in Stockholm
Stockholm
Stockholm